Lipsotelus is a genus of moths belonging to the subfamily Olethreutinae of the family Tortricidae.

Species
Lipsotelus anacanthus Diakonoff, 1973
Lipsotelus armiger Diakonoff, 1973
Lipsotelus lichenoides Walsingham, in Walsingham & Durrant, in Swinhoe, 1900
Lipsotelus xyloides Diakonoff, 1973

See also
List of Tortricidae genera

References

External links
tortricidae.com

Tortricidae genera
Olethreutinae